Sara Schaefer (born July 10, 1978) is an American stand-up comedian, writer, and author.

Personal life
Schaefer was raised in Midlothian, Virginia, the daughter of Billie and William "Bill" Schaefer. Her mother started the charity Pennies for Heaven, Inc. She attended Maggie Walker Governor's School, and went to college at William & Mary. Schaefer lives in Los Angeles.

Career
Following college, in 2000, Schaefer moved to New Orleans and participated in the theater scene. In 2001 Schaefer moved to New York City and began writing, producing and performing comedy. During that time she also worked as a damages analyst at a New York City law firm. In 2006 and 2007, she hosted an on-line comedy/music show for AOL called The DL, for which she made around 350 videos or segments with a varied assortment of noted and upcoming artists, musicians and performers, from Hulk Hogan and Aretha Franklin to Jimmy Fallon and Jamie Kennedy. In 2007, she was a featured performer at the HBO Comedy Arts Festival in Aspen, Colorado. In 2008, she was an editor for VH1's Best Week Ever blog.  She has appeared on E!, VH-1, Fuse and Late Night with Jimmy Fallon. In 2009 New York Magazine named Schaefer one of the "Ten new comedians that funny people find funny."

She was the Head Blogger for Late Night with Jimmy Fallon from 2009 to 2011, for which she won the Emmy Award for Creative Achievement in Interactive Media (non-fiction) in both 2009 and 2010. In 2011 she wrote for the game show Who Wants to Be a Millionaire and was named one of the Huffington Post's "53 Favorite Female Comedians".

Sara's accolades include USA Today's "100 People of the Year in Pop Culture," Backstage Magazine Comics to Watch 2011, New York Post "Best Jests 2010," ECNY Award Nominee: Best Female Stand Up 2010, Comedy Central's Comics to Watch Showcase 2010, and New York Magazine's "10 Comedians to Watch" 2010.

From early 2011 to 2014, Schaefer hosted a podcast with comedian Nikki Glaser called You Had To Be There.

Nikki & Sara Live, a weekly talk show television series hosted by Schaefer and Glaser, premiered on January 29, 2013, on MTV. MTV cancelled the show after two seasons.

In 2013, Schaefer made her stand-up comedy television debut on John Oliver's New York Stand-Up Show. She has gone on to write for numerous television shows including Problematic with Moshe Kasher, The Fake News with Ted Nelms starring Ed Helms, The Mark Twain Prize for American Humor, and The History of Swear Words. In 2017, she created, produced and hosted the digital series Woman Online for Seriously.TV. Schaeffer's stand up show Little White Box debuted to a sold-out run at the 2017 Edinburgh Fringe Festival. Her scripted web series Day Job was named one of 100 Best Web Series by TimeOut New York. Her Comedy Central Stand-Up Presents half hour special aired in November 2019.

Schaefer's memoir Grand was published by Simon & Schuster imprint Gallery Books in August 2020.

Filmography

Work

References

External links

1978 births
American women podcasters
American podcasters
American women comedians
College of William & Mary alumni
Late night television talk show hosts
Living people
Writers from New York City
Writers from Richmond, Virginia
Comedians from New York City
People from Midlothian, Virginia
21st-century American comedians
Maggie L. Walker Governor's School for Government and International Studies alumni
21st-century American women